The California Volcano Observatory (CalVO) is the volcano observatory that monitors the volcanic and geologic activity of California and Nevada. It is a part of the Volcano Hazards Program of the United States Geological Survey, a scientific agency of the United States government.

Originally, the volcano observatory was known as the Long Valley Observatory which monitored volcanic activity east of the Sierra Nevada in Mono County, California which included Long Valley Caldera, Mammoth Mountain, and the Mono–Inyo Craters.

In 2012, the Long Valley Observatory was integrated into the new California Volcano Observatory based in Menlo Park, California which covers the entire states of California and Nevada, this includes the southern Cascade Range volcanoes in the state of California which were previously under the jurisdiction of the Cascades Volcano Observatory.

Monitored volcanoes

These are the volcanoes monitored by the California Volcano Observatory, in order of highest to lowest risk assessment.

According to USGS risk assessment of the volcanoes in CalVO's region, the following volcanoes were ranked "very high threat potential".
Mount Shasta in far-northern California, north of Redding
Lassen Volcanic Center in Lassen Volcanic National Park
Long Valley Caldera in eastern California

These were ranked "high threat potential":
Mono-Inyo Craters in eastern California
Clear Lake Volcanic Field north of the San Francisco Bay Area
Medicine Lake Volcano in far-northern California, northeast of Mt Shasta
Salton Buttes in far-southern California, at the Salton Sea

These were ranked "moderate threat potential":
Mono Lake Volcanic Field in eastern California
Coso Volcanic Field in eastern California
Soda Lakes in northwestern Nevada near Fallon
Mammoth Mountain in eastern California
Ubehebe Craters in Death Valley National Park

One was ranked "Low to Very Low Threat Potential":
Golden Trout Creek volcanic field in Sequoia National Forest.

Other volcanoes in the region have not been assessed at one of these risk levels that warrant monitoring. Volcanoes which have not erupted during the Holocene were not included. USGS noted that though less probable it is still possible for volcanoes to erupt on longer intervals than that.

See also
Bishop Tuff
Hot Creek (Mono County, California)

References

External links
 

2012 establishments in California
Earth sciences
Government agencies established in 2012
Volcano observatories
Volcanism of California
Volcanism of Nevada
United States Geological Survey
Buildings and structures in Mono County, California
Inyo National Forest
Sierra Nevada (United States)